Tulare Lake was a large, shallow lake in eastern Amador Valley, surrounded by Willow Marsh (also known as the Lagoon).  Tule rushes and willow trees once lined the marshes and sloughs of its shores.  Drainage alterations starting in the 19th century have since reduced the marsh to the Arroyo de la Laguna, and the city of Pleasanton has since expanded across what was once marshland.  Such rapid developments have led to tricky seasonal flow variations in Niles Canyon.

The lake was fed by Arroyos Mocho, Valle, and Las Positas (when rainfall was substantial enough for them to reach the lagoon), as well as by Tassajara Creek and other Amador Valley creeks. Its seasonal outlet was the Arroyo de la Laguna.

References 

 
Lakes of Alameda County, California